Washington Crossing or Washington's Crossing may refer to:

Historical event
 George Washington's crossing of the Delaware River, event during the American Revolutionary War before the Battle of Trenton on December 26, 1776

Places
 Washington's Crossing, National Historic Landmark for the event in both New Jersey and Pennsylvania
 Washington Crossing State Park, New Jersey
 Washington Crossing Historic Park, Pennsylvania
 Washington Crossing, New Jersey
 Washington Crossing, Pennsylvania
 Washington Crossing Bridge, between Washington Crossing, New Jersey and Washington Crossing, Pennsylvania
 Washington Crossing Bridge (Pittsburgh), Pennsylvania
 Washington Crossing National Cemetery, Pennsylvania

Art and literature
 Washington's Crossing (book), by David Hackett Fischer
 Washington Crossing the Delaware (1851 painting), by Emanuel Leutze
 Washington Crossing the Delaware (1953 painting), by Larry Rivers
 "Washington Crossing the Delaware" (sonnet), a 1936 sonnet by David Schulman
 The Crossing (2000 film), an A&E television movie

See also
 Washington Crossing the Delaware (disambiguation)